Alphonsus comte de Rayneval (1 August 1813, Paris – 10 February 1858, Paris) was French politician, and Foreign Minister.

He was the son of Francis, comte de Rayneval, Undersecretary of State for Foreign Affairs of the Restoration.
His sister was Clemence de Rayneval.

He was undersecretary to the French Ambassador to Rome, Ambassador of France to Naples, and to Spain.
He was Minister of Foreign Affairs 31 October 1849 to 17 November 1849, in the Government of Alphonse Henri, comte d'Hautpoul.

He is buried at Père Lachaise Cemetery.

References

External links
"Rayneval, Alphonse Gerard De", DSpace at Tartu University Library (Estonia), Kiri Peterburi TA-le (1800)

1813 births
1858 deaths
Politicians from Paris
Diplomats from Paris
Counts of France
French Foreign Ministers
People of the French Second Republic
People of the Second French Empire
19th-century French politicians
19th-century French diplomats
Ambassadors of France to Spain
Burials at Père Lachaise Cemetery